Artyom Minulin (born 1 October 1998) is a Russian professional ice hockey defenseman for Metallurg Magnitogorsk of the Kontinental Hockey League (KHL).

Playing career
Minulin was drafted in the first round, 29th overall, by the Swift Current Broncos in the 2015 CHL Import Draft. On 31 October 2018, he was traded from the Broncos to the Everett Silvertips. In three seasons with the Broncos, he recorded 26 goals and 100 assists in 206 games. During the 2017–18 season, he won the WHL Championship with the Silvertips.

On 14 July 2019, Minulin signed a one-year contract with Metallurg Magnitogorsk of the KHL. He made his professional debut for Magnitogorsk during the 2019–20 season, where he appeared in 21 regular season games, and recorded one goal and two assists in five playoff games. On 1 May 2020, he signed a two-year contract extension with Magnitogorsk through the 2021–22 season.

International play

Minulin represented Russia at the 2018 World Junior Ice Hockey Championships.

On 23 January 2022, Minulin was named to the roster to represent Russian Olympic Committee athletes at the 2022 Winter Olympics.

Career statistics

Regular season and playoffs

International

References

External links
 

1998 births
Living people
Everett Silvertips players
Metallurg Magnitogorsk players
Stalnye Lisy players
Swift Current Broncos players
Zauralie Kurgan players
Russian expatriate sportspeople in Canada
Russian expatriate sportspeople in the United States
Russian expatriate ice hockey people
Russian ice hockey defencemen
People from Tyumen
Ice hockey players at the 2022 Winter Olympics
Olympic ice hockey players of Russia
Medalists at the 2022 Winter Olympics
Olympic silver medalists for the Russian Olympic Committee athletes
Olympic medalists in ice hockey
Sportspeople from Tyumen Oblast